Ezequiel Montagna (born 8 June 1994) is an Argentine professional footballer who plays as a winger for Dalkurd FF.

Career
San Lorenzo signed Montagna in 2010. On 9 January 2016, San Martín borrowed Montagna for the 2016 and 2016–17 seasons. He made his professional debut on 6 February during a win over Newell's Old Boys, before scoring for the first time in a 1–0 victory versus Tigre on 12 March. He ended the 2016 campaign with two goals in twelve appearances, prior to scoring two in twenty-four during 2016–17; both goals coming against parent club San Lorenzo in August 2016. He returned to San Lorenzo in June 2017, but was immediately loaned back out to play for Temperley. One goal in eighteen fixtures followed.

On 16 August 2018, Montagna joined Primera B Nacional's Atlético de Rafaela. In July 2019, Montagna headed across the division to sign with Tigre. He made his debut on 5 November against Deportivo Riestra, replacing Matías Pérez Acuña as a second-half substitute. That was his only appearance for Tigre, with the midfielder subsequently departing in January 2020 to join Swedish Superettan side Norrby IF; penning a three-year contract. He made his bow off the bench against Östers IF on 17 June, before making his first start days later versus GAIS. He scored once for them, netting against Västerås SK on 25 July.

On 1 February 2021, Montagna moved across the Superettan to Dalkurd FF; penning a three-year contract.

Career statistics
.

References

External links

1994 births
Living people
Sportspeople from Mar del Plata
Argentine footballers
Association football wingers
Argentine expatriate footballers
Argentine Primera División players
Primera Nacional players
Superettan players
San Lorenzo de Almagro footballers
San Martín de San Juan footballers
Club Atlético Temperley footballers
Atlético de Rafaela footballers
Club Atlético Tigre footballers
Norrby IF players
Dalkurd FF players
Expatriate footballers in Sweden
Argentine expatriate sportspeople in Sweden